Shane Kelly (born 11 January 1977) is an Australian former professional rugby league footballer who played for the Canberra Raiders in the National Rugby League.

Playing career
Kelly played two seasons of first-grade at Canberra. He played the final two rounds of the 2000 home and away season, off the bench, then in 2001 was the starting centre in the first nine rounds of the season.

His younger brother Brad also played in the NRL for Canberra.

References

External links
Shane Kelly at Rugby League project

1977 births
Living people
Australian rugby league players
Rugby league centres
Canberra Raiders players